Berclair is an unincorporated community in Goliad County, Texas, United States. It is part of the Victoria, Texas Metropolitan Statistical Area.

History
Berclair was founded in 1889 when the railroad was extended to that point. The town's name is an amalgamation of Bert and Clair Lucas, the names of local ranchers.

See also
Berclair Mansion

References

External links
Handbook of Texas Online

Unincorporated communities in Goliad County, Texas
Unincorporated communities in Texas
Victoria, Texas metropolitan area
Populated places established in 1889